This Unique Museum is the pseudonym of Benjamin Fitton who is an English singer-songwriter. He released his first album in 2006 after winning a best unsigned band competition on London's XFM Radio. He has released a number of records and a handful of EPs, with the former being recorded as Chapters, which are original tracks and the later as Installments, which are slower reinterpretations of alternative rock songs.

Discography 
A Collection Of Short Stories (2006)
Installment One: A Killer, A Murder, A Mystery... (2007)
Chapter One: A Catalogue of Madness & Melancholy (2007)
Installment Two: Charms & Grace (2007)
Lost At Sea: Out-Takes From The Great Lake (2008)
Installment Three: A Little Ghost For The Offering (2009)
Installment Four: Leave the Fire Behind (2010)
Chapter Two: Caught Between The Devil and the Deep Blue Sea (2011)

References

External links
Official Website

British male singers
Living people
Year of birth missing (living people)